Datisca glomerata is a species of plant native to California, Nevada, and Baja California known by the common name Durango root. It is one of only two to four species in the plant family Datiscaceae. It is an erect perennial herb with distinctive long, pointed, often sharply serrated leaves. It is said to superficially resemble Cannabis species. Its yellowish green flowers grow in clusters from the axilla of the leaf, where it joins the stem. A thick stand of the plant can form a medium-sized bush. All parts of this plant are toxic and in some areas it is considered a noxious weed. It is reported to be poisonous to cattle.

It is also one of a rare group of androdioecious species.

References

External links
Datisca glomerata @The Jepson Herbarium

Datiscaceae
Plants described in 1871
Taxa named by Henri Ernest Baillon
Taxa named by Carl Borivoj Presl